Li Weifeng (born 1 December 1978) is a Chinese football manager and former international footballer. He is the manager of the Chinese Super League club Guangzhou City F.C.

Club career 
Li Weifeng started his football career with Tianjin Locomotive's youth academy before he was spotted by the Chinese national youth program to study football abroad in a training program sponsored by Jianlibao. This then saw him called up to the Chinese under-20 national team and given a chance to play in the 1997 FIFA World Youth Championship. Upon his return from the tournament Li was returned to his initial youth team of Tianjin Locomotive until top tier club Shenzhen Ping'an showed an interest in him, not wanting to lose a promising young player a contract dispute would arise until a fee of 800,000 yuan was reportedly agree upon. In the 1998 league season he made his debut for the club and quickly established himself at the heart of the team's defense, guiding them to a 12th-place finish and doing enough to avoid relegation.

In the following seasons with Shenzhen, Li establish himself as an integral member of the team and would go on to represent his country in the 2002 FIFA World Cup. With the exposure of the tournament, a short trial at Premier League side Everton immediately followed as part of an Everton deal with Chinese sponsor Kejian. His time at Everton he only made two appearances, playing once in the league against Southampton and once in the League Cup against Wrexham. He was unable to make an impact at the club and returned to  Shenzhen after the 2002-03 season.

In the 2003 league season, Li returned from his loan spell at Everton and was immediately incorporated back into the team. He was soon made club captain by then manager Zhu Guanghu and within his second spell at the club he would lead them to the 2004 Chinese Super League title for the first time in the club's history. After that success, Zhu Guanghu was offered the Chinese Head coach position and Chi Shangbin came in as his replacement. Unfortunately for Chi, results significantly deteriorated under his reign and Li along with several other members of the team in Li Yi and Yang Chen publicly criticized his management which resulted in his resignation.

In the beginning of the 2006 season, Li left Shenzhen due to the club's financial difficulties and followed many of his teammates out of the club. Shanghai Shenhua bought him for 6 million yuan despite reported interest from Serie A side Fiorentina. In 2008, Li transferred from Shanghai  to Wuhan Guanggu due to a lack of playing time for the league runners-up, reuniting him with his former manager Zhu Guanghu who also coached him in the Chinese national team as well as in Shenzhen. Soon after the transfer, Li was involved in an on-the-field scuffle with Lu Jiang which resulted in him being suspended for eight games by the Chinese Football Association. Already on the verge of relegation, Wuhan amounted protests against this ruling which the club deemed to be unjust and extremely damaging to its chance to survive in the top flight. After its efforts were proven to be futile, Wuhan withdrew from the league and was disbanded and Li did not appear in any games for the rest of the season.

Because of Wuhan's withdrawal, most of its non-local and highly paid players were put on the transfer list at the end of the season, with Li among them. Because of his reputation, high wage demands, gigantic transfer fee, and the unserved eight-game suspension, Li was a hard commodity to move despite being perceived as heads and shoulders above the rest of the Chinese defenders. But the new AFC Champions League rule came to his rescue as it allowed all tournament participants to have one foreign Asian player. Attracting heavy interest from both the Japanese and Korean leagues, Li moved to K-League side Suwon Samsung Bluewings in January 2009, signing a two-year contract for a reported $400,000 and reuniting him with another one of his former managers. Some pundits suggested that Li moved on a free transfer because Wuhan's withdrawal made all of its players free agents under FIFA's rules. However, Wuhan immediately released statements announcing its intention to obstruct the move if it was not at least partly remunerated and media reports stated that Li would pay his former club himself in order to play for the Korean outfit. In his debut appearance, he was sent off against Sparta Prague in a friendly match in Hong Kong; however, Li redeemed himself in his first official match for Suwon in an AFC Champions League match in a 4-1 win against Kashima Antlers by scoring the opening goal.

On 18 January 2011, Li signed with Chinese Super League side Tianjin Teda and was named as the club captain. On 20 July 2015, Li was released by the club midway through the 2015 season.

Li was appointed as the vice managing director of Tianjin Quanjian in September 2015.

International career
Li made his first appearance for the Chinese national team on 22 November 1998 in a friendly match against South Korea, which ended in a 0-0 draw. His performances for the national team would see him called up to China's squads for the 2000 AFC Asian Cup and 2002 FIFA World Cup. In 2003, he was promoted to team captain by then manager Arie Haan and would lead China to a runners-up position at the 2004 AFC Asian Cup. In September 2006, he was banned from the national team for attacking an opposing player and hence earning his sixth red card in fourteen months during an AFC Champions League game with Shanghai Shenhua. His position as captain of the national team was stripped and later assigned to Zheng Zhi. The ban was removed after a year, but since then he never had any significant role in the national team anymore. He returned as Captain during the 2014 World Cup qualifying, but his return could not help China pass through the Third Round, after two shocking losses to Iraq.

Playstyle
He has strength in a strong fighting spirit and an interpersonal mark. And the timing of the jump and heading is really good, so the ability to take control of the airborne ball is excellent.

Career statistics

Club statistics

International goals
Results list China's goal tally first.

Honours

Club
Shenzhen Ping'an
Chinese Super League: 2004

Shanghai Shenhua
A3 Champions Cup: 2007

Suwon Bluewings
Korean FA Cup: 2009

Tianjin Teda
Chinese FA Cup: 2011

International
China PR national football team
East Asian Football Championship: 2005

Individual
Chinese Super League Team of the Year: 1999, 2001, 2003, 2004

See also
 List of men's footballers with 100 or more international caps

References

External links 
 
 
 

1978 births
Living people
2002 FIFA World Cup players
2000 AFC Asian Cup players
2004 AFC Asian Cup players
2007 AFC Asian Cup players
China international footballers
Chinese expatriate footballers
Chinese expatriate sportspeople in South Korea
Everton F.C. players
Expatriate footballers in England
Expatriate footballers in South Korea
Chinese footballers
Footballers at the 2008 Summer Olympics
Chinese Super League players
K League 1 players
Olympic footballers of China
Footballers from Changchun
Premier League players
Shanghai Shenhua F.C. players
Shenzhen F.C. players
Suwon Samsung Bluewings players
Wuhan Guanggu players
FIFA Century Club
Tianjin Jinmen Tiger F.C. players
Asian Games medalists in football
Footballers at the 1998 Asian Games
Asian Games bronze medalists for China
Association football defenders
Medalists at the 1998 Asian Games